The Estádio Municipal 14 de Dezembro is a stadium in Toledo, Brazil. It has a capacity of 15,280 spectators.  It is the home of Toledo Colônia Work. The stadium is known as "The Cathedral of Football" by the home supporters.

References

Football venues in Paraná (state)